Irakli Maysuradze (born 24 May 2000) is a Georgian figure skater. He has won four senior international medals and competed in the final segment at six ISU Championships.

Personal life 
Maysuradze was born on 24 May 2000 in Tbilisi, Georgia. He moved to Moscow, Russia, when he was four years old.

Career

2014–2015 season 
Maysuradze debuted on the Junior Grand Prix (JGP) series in the 2014–2015 season. In January 2015, he finished fifth at the European Youth Olympic Festival in Dornbirn, Austria. In March, he qualified for the final segment at the 2015 World Junior Championships in Tallinn, Estonia by placing 24th in the short program. After placing 16th in the free skate, he rose to 18th overall. Vladimir Kotin and Sergei Davydov coached him in Moscow, Russia, until the end of the season.

2015–2016 season 
During the 2015–2016 season, Maysuradze was coached by Rafael Arutyunyan and Vera Arutyunyan in Artesia, California. He qualified for the free skate at the 2016 World Junior Championships in Debrecen, Hungary, placing 24th in both segments and overall.

2016–2017 season 
In 2016–2017, Maysuradze was coached by Sergei Davydov in Moscow. Returning to the JGP series, he placed 6th in Saransk, Russia, and 7th in Tallinn, Estonia. In November, he stepped onto his first senior international podium, winning silver at Ice Star in Belarus. The following month, he took silver at the Santa Claus Cup in Hungary.

2017–2018 season 
Maysuradze remained in Moscow but changed coaches, joining Svetlana Sokolovskaia. During the season, he qualified to the free skate at two ISU Championships. At the 2018 European Championships in Moscow, he finished 17th overall after placing 18th in the short and 15th in the free. At the 2018 World Junior Championships in Sofia (Bulgaria), he placed 9th in the short, 15th in the free, and 12th overall.

Programs

Competitive highlights 
CS: Challenger Series; JGP: Junior Grand Prix

References

External links 
 

2000 births
Male single skaters from Georgia (country)
Living people
Sportspeople from Tbilisi
Expatriate sportspeople from Georgia (country) in Russia